Jimmy Duggan (born 1947 in Tuam, County Galway) is an Irish former Gaelic footballer. He played for his local club Corofin and was a member of the Galway senior inter-county team from 1966 until 1978.

References

1948 births
Living people
Dual players
Corofin Gaelic footballers
Galway inter-county Gaelic footballers
Galway inter-county hurlers
People from Tuam